Murky Depths bylined as "The Quarterly Anthology of Graphically Dark Speculative Fiction" was a British horror and science fiction magazine which began publishing in 2007. The magazine editor-in-chief was Terry Martin and the editor was Anne Stringer. The magazine was published four times a year. It blended illustrated prose short stories with comic strips. Since Issue #3 it featured a gloss laminated card cover, whereas Issue #1 and #2 covers were on the same paper stock as the contents. From Issue #7 the cover artwork had been wraparound. Its size was unusual for a magazine, being American comic book or graphic novel format. Murky Depths received the British Fantasy Awards Best Magazine/Periodical in 2010 and shortlisted for the same award in 2011.

The last issue of Murky Depths was published in October 2011 but the publishers, The House of Murky Depths (based in the village of Fosdyke in South Lincolnshire, according to Yell.com), continue to sell back issues.

Issues
Murky Depths Issue #1 – September, 2007 – 
Murky Depths Issue #2 – December, 2007 –  
Murky Depths Issue #3 – March, 2008 – 
Murky Depths Issue #4 – June, 2008 – 
Murky Depths Issue #5 – September, 2008 – 
Murky Depths Issue #6 – Winter, 2008 –  
Murky Depths Issue #7 – Spring, 2009 – 
Murky Depths Issue #8 – Summer, 2009 – 
Murky Depths Issue #9 – Autumn, 2009 – 
Murky Depths Issue #10 – Winter, 2009 – 
Murky Depths Issue #11 – Spring, 2010 – 
Murky Depths Issue #12 – Summer, 2010 – 
Murky Depths Issue #13 – Autumn, 2010 – 
Murky Depths Issue #14 – Winter, 2010 – 
Murky Depths Issue #15 – Spring, 2011 – 
Murky Depths Issue #16 – Summer, 2011 – 
Murky Depths Issue #17 – Autumn, 2011 (print error: Summer, 2011 on back cover) – 
Murky Depths Issue #18 – Winter, 2011 –

Contributing writers
Authors published by Murky Depths included Robert Rankin, Jon Courtenay Grimwood, Stan Nicholls, Sam Stone, Eugie Foster, Richard Calder, Edward Morris, Edward M. Erdelac, Chris Huff, Matt Wallace, R. D. Hall, Mike Carey, Juliet E. McKenna, C. J. Carter-Stephenson and Lavie Tidhar. A comprehensive list is available at the Murky Depths website.

Cover artists
Murky Depths cover artists included Les Edwards, Edward Miller, Steve Stone, Richard Calder, Chris Moore and Geoff Taylor. A comprehensive list is available at the Murky Depths website.

Comic artists
Murky Depths comic strip artists included Robert Rankin, Luke Cooper, David Ryan, Lucas Hinchley, Richard Calder, Leonardo M. Giron and Neil Roberts. A comprehensive list is available at the Murky Depths website.

Story illustrators
Murky Depths story illustrators included Nancy Farmer, Ed Norden, Jason Beam, Glen James, James Fletcher, Mark Bell and Nathaniel Milljour. A comprehensive list is available at the Murky Depths website.

Awards
 Voted Best Magazine/Periodical in the British Fantasy Awards 2010
 Cover of Issue #4 by Vincent Chong shortlisted for BSFA Best Artwork 2008
 "Looking in Looking Out" by Martin Deep nominated for BSFA Best Artwork 2007
 Shortlisted for Best Magazine/Periodical in the British Fantasy Awards 2011

References

External links
 Murky Depths
 The House of Murky Depths

2007 establishments in the United Kingdom
2011 disestablishments in the United Kingdom
Defunct science fiction magazines published in the United Kingdom
Horror fiction magazines
Magazines established in 2007
Magazines disestablished in 2011
Quarterly magazines published in the United Kingdom